Ruslan Volodymyrovych Kostyshyn (born 8 January 1977) is a Ukrainian retired professional footballer who played as a midfielder and current football manager of Kazakhstani club Aksu.

Career
Kostyshyn began his career in Podillya-Khmelnytskyi, from which he moved to play for CSKA Kyiv, Arsenal Kyiv, Dnipro and in 2007 he joined Kryvbas Kryvyi Rih. Kostyshyn played 270 matches in the Ukrainian Premier League and managed to score 26 goals. He is currently one of the vice-captains of the club, and captained Kryvbas four times.

Olympics
Kostyshyn represented Ukraine national team in the Olympics, during which he played 3 games.

Achievements
Team
 Ukrainian Premier League Bronze: 2004
 Ukrainian Cup Finalist 1998, 2000, 2003

Personal
Ruslan has a brother Vitaliy Kostyshyn who plays football and later became a coach as well as his son Denys Kostyshyn also became footballer.

External links
 
 Official Website Profile
 Profile on Football Squads

1977 births
Living people
Ukrainian footballers
FC Kryvbas Kryvyi Rih players
FC Dnipro players
FC Arsenal Kyiv players
FC CSKA Kyiv players
FC Podillya Khmelnytskyi players
FC Advis Khmelnytskyi players
Ukrainian Premier League players
Ukrainian First League players
Ukrainian Second League players
Sportspeople from Khmelnytskyi, Ukraine
Ukrainian football managers
FC Kolos Kovalivka managers
Ukrainian Premier League managers
Ukrainian First League managers
Ukrainian Second League managers
Association football midfielders
Ukrainian expatriate football managers
Expatriate football managers in Kazakhstan
Ukrainian expatriate sportspeople in Kazakhstan